Darr Sabko Lagta Hai (Hindi: डर सबको लगता है English: Everybody feels fear) was an Indian anthology horror fiction television series, which premiered on 31 October 2015 and was broadcast on &TV. The series aired on every Saturday and Sunday nights. The series was produced by Reel Life Entertainment. Ending on 17 April 2016, two seasons of the series have been successfully aired. Bipasha Basu hosted the first season of the series. Completing two seasons, 49 episodes had been aired.

Series overview

Episodes

Season 1 (2015–16)

Season 2 (2016)

References

External links
Official Website on ZEE5

Lists of anthology television series episodes
Lists of horror television series episodes
Lists of Indian television series episodes